Richard Rawson, also known as Fazer, is an English rapper, producer, DJ and songwriter, and member of hip hop trio N-Dubz.

Richard Rawson may also refer to:

 Richard Hamilton Rawson (1863–1918), British politician and Member of Parliament for the Conservative Party and National Party
 Richard Rawson (fl. 1475–1485), father of John Rawson, 1st Viscount Clontarf, and Master of the Mercers' Company in 1477 and 1483
 Richard Rawson, Sheriff of London in 1477
 Richard Rawson (died 1543), brother of John Rawson, 1st Viscount Clontarf, and Archdeacon of West Ham
 Richard Rawson (priest) (died 1543), Archdeacon of Essex from 1503 and Canon of Windsor, 1523–1543